Tinteira is a settlement in the eastern part of the island of Fogo, Cape Verde. It is situated 4 km north of Cova Figueira, 5 km south of Relva and 22 km east of the island capital São Filipe. At the 2010 census its population was 410. Its elevation is 300 meters. Tinteira consists of the localities Tinteira, Cova Matinho and Cutelo Capado.

See also
List of villages and settlements in Cape Verde

References

Villages and settlements in Fogo, Cape Verde
Santa Catarina do Fogo